John Francis Collin (April 30, 1802 – September 16, 1889) was an American politician who served one term as a U.S. Representative from New York 1845 to 1847.

Biography 
Born in Hillsdale, New York, Collin attended the common schools and Lenox Academy, Massachusetts.
He engaged in agricultural pursuits.
He served as member of the State assembly in 1834.
Supervisor of Hillsdale.

Congress 
Collin was elected as a Democrat to the Twenty-ninth Congress (March 4, 1845 – March 3, 1847).
He served as chairman of the Committee on Expenditures in the Department of the Navy (Twenty-ninth Congress).

Later career and death 
He resumed agricultural pursuits.

He died in Hillsdale, New York, September 16, 1889.
He was interred in Hillsdale Rural Cemetery.

References

1802 births
1889 deaths
Democratic Party members of the United States House of Representatives from New York (state)
19th-century American politicians